Scott Raab (born March 21, 1952) is an American nonfiction author and former contributing journalist for Esquire.

Early years
Scott Raab was born in Cleveland, Ohio, in 1952. The Raab family relocated to Los Angeles in 1960, but after his parents divorced in 1962, he returned to Cleveland with his mother and two younger brothers. Raab graduated from Cleveland State in 1983 with a bachelor's degree, and in 1986 received his Master of Fine Arts in fiction from the Iowa Writers' Workshop.

Professional career

Raab was a writer for GQ Magazine from 1992 until 1997, and was a regular contributor to Esquire from 1997 until 2016. Much of his work at Esquire was one-on-one interviews with various celebrities (e.g. Phil Spector, Paul Giamatti, Don Zimmer). The style of his non-interview writing is typically informal in nature, mainly in the voice of a storyteller.

Personal
Raab is a self-professed "fat Jew from Cleveland, a great deli town" who has mentioned on several occasions his anti-haute cuisine disposition. Although not a food writer by trade, he has written frequently about the Cleveland food scene, and may be the biggest pundit of Slyman's Deli's award-winning corned-beef sandwich, which he has mentioned in more than one article appearing in Esquire.

He is a remarried divorcé, who currently lives in New Jersey with his wife and son.

An avid fan of the Cleveland Indians, Raab has a tattoo of Chief Wahoo on his forearm, which he had done in a Dallas tattoo parlor during a 1994 interview with NBA player Dennis Rodman. He has since advocated for the logo to be retired.

Bibliography

 
 
 
 
 You're Welcome, Cleveland: How I Helped Lebron James Win a Championship and Save a City (2016)

External links
Home page

References

1952 births
Writers from Cleveland
Jewish American writers
American essayists
American male journalists
American magazine staff writers
Cleveland State University alumni
Iowa Writers' Workshop alumni
Living people
American male essayists
Journalists from Ohio
Esquire (magazine) people